Techwell Inc. was a fabless semiconductor company founded in 1997, that was based in San Jose, California. It is now a division of Intersil.

History
Techwell had an initial public offering (IPO) on the Nasdaq in 2006, trading under NASDAQ: TWLL.

Techwell was acquired by Intersil on March 22, 2010, for US$370 million.

Intersil Techwell develops chips for video devices such as security video systems, LCD display based entertainment systems, in-flight entertainment systems, digital video recorders and automobile rear view video monitors. The Intersil Techwell division is based in Milpitas, California.

References

Fabless semiconductor companies
Defunct computer companies based in California
Defunct semiconductor companies of the United States
Technology companies based in the San Francisco Bay Area
Companies based in San Jose, California
Computer companies established in 1997
Electronics companies established in 1997
Manufacturing companies disestablished in 2010
1997 establishments in California
2010 disestablishments in California
Defunct companies based in the San Francisco Bay Area